Player 5150 is a 2008 American film directed by David O'Neill.

Plot
Joey is a stock trader with a gambling addiction. He and his wife Ali get in trouble with a loan shark Tony. Kelly Carlson plays Lucy, the loan shark's blonde assistant.

Cast
Scott Eastwood as Brian Vicks
Kelly Carlson as Lucy
Kathleen Robertson as Ali
Christopher McDonald as Tony
Bob Gunton as Nick
Angela Little as  Jenny Starz
Elaine Hendrix as Mrs. Lanzelin
Ethan Embry as Joey
Bob Sapp as Beno
Sandra Taylor as Concierge Dianne
Paul Ben-Victor as Jimmy
Sean O'Bryan as Jerry

Production
Filming took place in Los Angeles and Las Vegas, and began in December 2006.

References

External links
 
 

2008 films
Films about gambling
2008 drama films
American drama films
2000s English-language films
2000s American films